OverDrive is a drive time sports radio show hosted by Bryan Hayes alongside Jeff O'Neill and Jamie McLennan. The show airs from 4 to 7 pm ET on TSN 1050 in Toronto, simulcasted on TSN and iHeartRadio, and as a podcast.

History
The show originally aired as Leafs Lunch weekdays from 12 to 2 pm. On February 22, 2016, TSN 1050 introduced a revamped weekday lineup where Andi Petrillo became host of Leafs Lunch and Bryan Hayes, Jamie McLennan, and Jeff O'Neill became hosts of the new drive time program weekdays from 4 to 7 pm, with the 4 pm and 5 pm hours being simulcasted on TSN4, and the 6 pm hour being simulcasted on TSN2.

On September 21, 2020, Pinty's was announced as the show's new presenting sponsor. The show was previously sponsored by The Source.

The show used to feature Ray Ferraro as a daily guest in the 5 pm hour before he expanded his role at ESPN in 2021.

On February 25, 2022, the show's three hosts as well as well as Leafs Lunch co-host and Overdrive contributor Michael DiStefano (aka Al's Brother) were announced as celebrity coaches for the CHL/NHL Top Prospects Game.

Format
OverDrive airs weekdays on TSN 1050 from 4 to 7 pm and is simulcasted on TSN from 4 to 6 pm on TSN4, and from 6 to 7 pm on TSN2. The show is a sports talk show featuring insights, interviews, stories, and banter.

See also
 Leafs Lunch

References

Further reading

External links
 OverDrive

The Sports Network original programming
Canadian sports radio programs
2010s Canadian sports television series
2010s Canadian television talk shows